Mohammad Ali is a Bangladesh Nationalist Party politician and a Member of Parliament from Narayanganj-4.

Career
Ali was elected to parliament from Narayanganj-4 as a Bangladesh Nationalist Party candidate on 15 February 1996.

References

Bangladesh Nationalist Party politicians
Year of birth missing (living people)
6th Jatiya Sangsad members